Walter Freitag (born 24 March 1925) is an Austrian former cyclist. He competed in the time trial and the team pursuit events at the 1948 Summer Olympics.

References

External links
 

1925 births
Possibly living people
Austrian male cyclists
Olympic cyclists of Austria
Cyclists at the 1948 Summer Olympics
Place of birth missing (living people)